The Battle of Ravenna, capital of the Western Roman Empire, between the Heruli under their King Odoacer and the remnants of the Western Roman army in Roman Italy occurred in early September 476, and represented a culminating event in the ongoing fall of the Western Roman Empire. The Roman Empire had been in relative decline since the beginning of the barbarian invasions and Rome, the symbolical heart and largest city of the Western Empire, was sacked in 410 by the Visigoths and in 455 by the Vandals. By 476 the Roman emperor was little more than a puppet, having very little de facto control of any territory outside of Italy. The last Roman emperor, Romulus Augustulus, was not recognized as a legitimate ruler outside of Italy; the Eastern Roman Empire recognized Julius Nepos as the true Western Roman Emperor.

Herulians were foederati of the Western Roman Empire; they were mercenary troops of the Roman army of Italy. They envied the fortune of their brethren in Gaul, Spain, and Africa, whose victorious arms had acquired an independent and perpetual inheritance; and they insisted that a third part of the lands of Italy should be immediately divided among them. Orestes, the father of emperor Romulus Augustus, rejected their demand – causing their revolt. From all the camps and garrisons of Italy the confederates flocked to the standard of Odoacer, their leader; Orestes later retreated to Pavia. Pavia was subsequently pillaged and Orestes was executed.

The decisive battle was fought on 2 September 476 near Ravenna, the capital of the Western Roman Empire: it saw the foederati defeat the largely depleted Roman garrison. The city, defended by Paulus (the brother of Orestes) was captured swiftly and easily. Two days later, the sixteen year old emperor Romulus Augustulus was forced to abdicate by Odoacer, ending twelve-hundred years of Roman rule in Italy beginning with the Roman Kingdom in 753 BC. Romulus was sent into retirement in Campania.

See also 
 Battle of Ravenna (475)

References 

476
Ravenna 476
Ravenna 476
Ravenna
Ravenna 476
5th century in Italy
Ravenna
470s in the Roman Empire
Fall of the Western Roman Empire